Midway is a ghost town in Tallahatchie County, Mississippi, United States.

References

Former populated places in Tallahatchie County, Mississippi
Former populated places in Mississippi